Charodi, also referred to as  Mestha(Mesta), Achari, Konkani Achari, Khandekar, or Nayak, is a community from Karnataka state in India. 

There is no caste called as Charodi in Hindu religion. They are believed to have migrated from Goa in four boats ('char' means four and 'hodi' means boat) which landed in four different places of Karnataka. Charodis were initially known as "Mestha" and after migration, they changed their names based on the location they landed. They are usually called Achari or Charodi in North Karnataka and Nayak or Mestha in South Karnataka. They as per their tales, they migrated from Goa via a sea route to coastal Karnataka. 

During the British Raj they were included among the "Denotified Tribes" of India. Their traditional work is carpentry. They are included in other backward class communities of Karnataka in post-independent India. 

They are generally followers of Sringeri Matha. They are also worshippers of Shiva, which is locally also known as Ravalnath.  Charodi Mestha Samaj had their own temples in Goa, Mangalore, Kundapur, Gangolli, Shiroor, Honnavar, Sirsi, Karwar, Sagar and Shimoga.

References

Social groups of Karnataka
Ethnic groups in India
Denotified tribes of India
Other Backward Classes
Hindu communities